EASA CS-25 is the European Aviation Safety Agency Certification Specification for Large Aeroplanes.

This certification procedure applies to large, turbine-powered aircraft. An explicit limitation of the aircraft mass is not specified (CS 25.1).

It describes the minimum requirements that must be met for the certification of an aircraft in this class. If the manufacturer of the aircraft has sufficiently demonstrated all points, the certification authority issues a type certificate.

See also
 List of large aircraft
 List of current production certified light aircraft
 EASA CS-LSA, the European certification for Light Sport Aeroplanes (maximum 600 for land / 650 kg for seaplanes)
 EASA CS-VLA, the European certification for Very Light Aircraft (maximum 750 kg)
 EASA CS-23, Normal, Utility, Aerobatic and Commuter Aeroplanes

References

External links
 CS-25 Large Aeroplanes | EASA
 CS-25 in PDF format 

Aviation licenses and certifications